Dorothy Jordan may refer to:

 Dorothea Jordan (sometimes called Dorothy or Dora, née Bland, 1761–1816), Anglo-Irish actress, courtesan, and mistress and companion of the future King William IV of the United Kingdom
 Dorothy Jordan (film actress) (1906–1988), American film actress

See also
 Dorothy Jordan Lloyd (1890–1946), British scientist